Dennis Savory (born 13 June 1943) is a British archer. He competed in the men's individual event at the 1980 Summer Olympics.

References

1943 births
Living people
British male archers
Olympic archers of Great Britain
Archers at the 1980 Summer Olympics
Sportspeople from Kettering